Leptodactylus natalensis is a species of frog in the family Leptodactylidae.
It is endemic to Brazil where it is found on the eastern coast. Leptodactylus natalensis is a very common species. It lives in muddy places at secondary lowland forests, shrubby vegetation, and wet cow pastures near forest, but not in primary forest. Breed takes place in temporary ponds.

References

natalensis
Endemic fauna of Brazil
Amphibians of Brazil
Taxonomy articles created by Polbot
Amphibians described in 1930